The Women's 10K race at the 2010 FINA World Open Water Swimming Championships was swum on Saturday, July 17, 2010, in Roberval, Quebec, Canada. It was the first event of the 2010 Open Water Worlds.

The race began at 11:30 a.m., and was swum in the Lac Saint-Jean in the city center. 37 women swam the event.

The 10 kilometre distance of the race was reached by completed 4 laps of the 2.5-kilometre course set up for the championships.

Results
All times in hours:minutes:seconds

Gorman disqualification
During the race Australia's Melissa Gorman was disqualified (DQ'd) for unsportsmanlike conduct. Three days later, on Tuesday, July 20, 2010, following a protest of her DQ by Swimming Australia, FINA overturned Gorman's DQ, reinstating her result which placed her in third. This moved China's FANG Yanqiao (and the rest of the finishers below them) down one place; Fang moving from third to fourth. France's Aurélie Muller's similar DQ for unsportsmanlike conduct was also reviewed; however, her disqualification was not overturned.

References

Fina World Open Water Swimming Championships - Women's 10k, 2010
World Open Water Swimming Championships